Electroclub is a Soviet and Russian electropop group founded in 1986.

History
Group "Electroclub" was active from 1985 till 1993. Musical director — Vladimir Dubovitskiy. Composer — David Tukhmanov. Group was founded and based on "Flames of Moscow" ( "Ogni Moskvy") Oscar Feltsman with musician Irina Allegrova, who has musical experience.

In 1986 from Ludmila Senchina's group has come singer and composer Igor Talkov. He was the ideologist of the group and the author of musical concept. The main song he had popular success with was "Clean Pounds" ( "Chistye Prudy"). In 1987 the Talkov's song "Three Letters" ( "Tri Pisma") was awarded with "Golden tuning fork" ( "Zolotoy kamerton") and gained a phonograph record of their songs.

After their first phonograph record Igor Talkov left the group and Tukhmanov has decided to invite vocal leader of the "Forum" band. After this invitation group has decided to work on the new album in November, 1987. The quality of sound was worse than the first album and the phonogram record has commercial failure. From the "Forum" band had invited Lazar Anastasiadi, Alexander Nazarov, Viktor Saltykov, Alexander Dronik.

Unexpectively, singer Raisa Saed-Shakh which has come from Vladimir Migulya's "Monitor", had left the group. Tukhmanov had written the Saed-Shakh's "Gusi-Gusi", "Malenkaya Zima", "Ballada o ledyanom dome" songs and the Talkov's "Telegrafistka" song but this songs weren't save. Dubovitskiy and Allegrova planed to disband Saed-Shakh from the group.

The basis of group were David Tukhmanov songs but also was songs of other authours especially Igor Talkov's and Igor Nikolaev's songs. The interest of the group had lost. Irina Allegrova worked with group till the middle of 1990 and then she has begun a solo career with Igor Nikolaev (She  had divorced with her husband Dubovitskiy in 1992). The "Electroclub-2" phonograph record was released in 1989.

Viktor Saltykov has left the group and has return to his first wife Irina Saltykova to St. Petersburg in 1990. Guitar player Vladimir Kulakovskiy has found "Kupe" band that year. With Nazarov the group has released one more album "White Panther"  and several music videos but hasn't gain any popularity. The group was dissolved in 1993. After the Tukhmanov's departure Alexander Nazarov has become the group director and has recorded several albums. Nazarov with Viktor Saltykov and Vasiliy Savchenko have short reunion in 1999. The record of the "Zhizn-doroga" song was saved and was shown in «Песня-93».

The later years Nazarov has tried to reunite the group and invite woman singers but this did not happen.

Participants in "Pesnya Goda" 

 1986 — Irina Allegrova — "Old mirror" ( "Staroye Zerkalo")
 1988 — Irina Allegrova — "Dark horse" ( "Tyomnaya Loshadka" (preliminary round)), Viktor Saltykov — "Don't Allow Him to Marry You" ( "Ty zamuzh za nyego ne vykhodi")
 1989 — Irina Allegrova — "Toy" ( "Igrushka"), Viktor Saltykov — "I don't forgive you" ( "Ya tebya ne proshchu")
 1990 — Irina Allegrova — "My honey man" ( "Moy laskovy i nezhny zver"), Viktor Saltykov — "Mom's daughter" ( "Mamenkina Dochka")
 1993 — Alexander Nazarov — "Road of life" ( "Zhizn-doroga")
 1999 — Viktor Saltykov — "Horse in apples" ( "Koni v yabolkakh")

Squad 
Vladimir Dubovitskiy
Viktor Saltykov (1987—1990)
 Alexander Nazarov (1987—1993)
 Vladimir Kulakovskiy
 Alexander Dronik
 Mikhail Palyey
 Pavel Nazarov
 Igor Talkov (1986—1987)
 Raisa Saed-Shakh (1986)
 Irina Allegrova (1986—1990)
 Vladimir Samoshin (1988)
 Vasiliy Savchenko (1991—1993)
 Alexander Pimonov (1991)

Discography
 1986 — "Happy Birthday" ( "Den Rozhdeniya") (EP)
 1987 — "David Tukhmanov, Electroclub group" ( "David Tukhmanov, gruppa Electroklub") (LP)
 1987 — "The memorial photo" ( "Foto na pamyat") (MC)
 1989 — "Electroclub-2" ( "Electroklub-2") (LP)
 1990 — "Toy" ( "Igrushka") (МС)
 1991 — "Mom's daughter" ( "Mamenkina Dochka") (МС)
 1993 — "White Panther" ( "Belaya Pantera") (LP) (recorded in 1991)

Awards 
 1987 — "Golden tunig fork" ( "Zolotoy kamerton").
 1988 — "Musical Olimp" ( "Muzykalny Olimp") best songs: «Ты замуж за него не выходи» (4th place), «Кони в яблоках» (8th place).
 1989 — best second musical group in newspaper "Moskovskij Komsomolets" («Московский комсомолец») (in topic «Звуковая дорожка»).

Video
 Нервы, нервы, нервы («Новогодний огонёк», 31.12.1986)
 Видеотека («Утренняя почта», весна 1987)
 Ты замуж за него не выходи («Новогодний огонёк», 1987)
 Тёмная лошадка («Новогодний огонёк», 1987)
 Дай мне слово («Утренняя почта», 1988)
 Кони в яблоках («Утренняя почта», 1988)
 Remember Moscow (1988)
 Схожу с ума («Взгляд», 1989)
 Последнее свидание («Утренняя почта», 1989)
 Ворожея («Утренняя почта», 1989)
 Игрушка (1989)
 Глупый мальчишка (1989)
 Я тебя не прощу (1989)
 Маменькина дочка («Песня года», 1990)
 Белая пантера (1991)
 Школьница (1991)
 Садовая скамейка (1991)
 Дело в шляпе
 Незаметная девчонка
 Ну, что же ты
 Полчаса («50/50»)
 Синяя роза
 Эх, ты, эх, я...
 Верни мне прошлое, скрипач (1992)
 Дальняя дорога (Ночь-распутница)
 Танечка-Танюша («Утренняя звезда», 1993)
 Научи меня любить

References

 «Electroclub» on Viktor Saltykov's site

Musical groups established in 1986
1986 establishments in Russia